Karin Kneissl (born 18 January 1965) is an Austrian diplomat, journalist and independent politician, having served as Minister of Foreign Affairs between 2017 and 2019. She is an expert on the Middle East and was a lecturer before assuming the government position she was offered by Chancellor Sebastian Kurz.

Since 2020 she has been working as a blogger for Russia Today, between June 2021 and May 2022 she was a member of the supervisory board of Rosneft.

Life and career
Born in Vienna, Kneissl spent part of her childhood in Amman, where her father worked as a pilot for King Hussein of Jordan and also was involved in developing Royal Jordanian Airlines. In her youth and student days Kneissl also was active in Amnesty International and supported environmental and human rights organizations worldwide.

Kneissl studied law and oriental languages at the University of Vienna between 1983 and 1987. After graduating, she studied International relations at the Hebrew University of Jerusalem and the University of Jordan in Amman. Subsequently, she spent a year as a Fulbright fellow at the Center for Contemporary Arab Studies at Georgetown University. In 1992 she graduated from the École nationale d'administration. She earned a PhD in international law with a dissertation on the Notion of borders of the belligerent parties of the Middle East.

In 1990 she joined Austria's Foreign Office. From 1990 to 1998 she worked in the cabinet of ÖVP foreign minister Alois Mock, in the International Law Office, and was posted abroad in Paris and Madrid. Her claim, that she was among the co-founders of the Austrian section of Médecins Sans Frontières in 1992/93, was roundly denied by the organization itself.

She left the diplomatic service in the fall of 1998, and has since lived in Seibersdorf near Vienna, where she was active between 2005 and 2010 as an independent local councilor on the list of ÖVP. Kneissl has since worked as a freelance journalist for German and English-language print media. She became known to the public through her political analyses in the Austrian Broadcasting Corporation, and she has authored several specialized and non-fiction books.

As an expert in international law, history of the Middle East and the energy market, Kneissl taught at the Diplomatic Academy of Vienna, the European Business School in Rheingau and was a guest lecturer at the National Defense Academy, the Military Academy in Wiener Neustadt and at universities in Lebanon, among them the francophone Université Saint-Joseph in Beirut. For ten years, she worked at the Department of Political Science at the University of Vienna. Among other things, she also writes as an independent correspondent for the daily newspapers Die Presse and Neue Zürcher Zeitung.

Kneissl was Vice President of the Austrian Society for Political-Military Studies STRATEG. From 2011 to 2015, she was on the board of Whistleblowing Austria. On 30 June 2012, she was guest of honor in the annual "multiculture ball" organized by the Afro-Asian Institute Graz (AAI Graz).

In her public writings and appearances Kneissl has often sharply criticised the European Union and raised controversy with remarks on migration. In July 2016, after the Brexit referendum, she criticised European Commission president Jean-Claude Juncker as "cynic of power", "rowdy" and "arrogant", who "behaves as a Brussels Caesar, who has made it his goal to break agreements, if it seems useful."
A quote from her book "My Middle East" also caused controversy, as she criticised Zionism, founded by Austro-Hungarian publicist Theodor Herzl, as a "blood and soil ideology" based on German nationalism in the 19th century.
On the issue of refugees, migration, and integration she was also accused of serving stereotypes. At the height of the refugee crisis in 2015, Kneissl pointed out that most of them are economic migrants and that asylum seekers are "80 percent" young men between the ages of 20 and 30. In September 2015, she said on public television that one of the reasons for the revolts in the Arab world was "these many young men", "testosterone-controlled", "who no longer managed to get a wife today" because they have neither work nor their own home, and thus could not achieve "status as a man in a traditional society".
She also sharply criticised German Chancellor Angela Merkel as "grossly negligent" for her selfies with refugees, and later described the EU-Turkey refugee agreement as "nonsense".
Such remarks led to criticism and caused doubts concerning her self-definition as a "conservative free-thinker", but also gained praise and sympathy from populist anti-mass migration party FPÖ, to whose events she was increasingly invited. In 2016, FPÖ leader Heinz-Christian Strache considered nominating Kneissl as presidential candidate, but eventually decided in favour of Norbert Hofer instead.

After Hofer was defeated by Alexander van der Bellen, Kneissl criticised Van der Bellen on the occasion of the discussion about the headscarf-ban, doubting his intelligence, character and format. "Not only Trump, others also provoke", she said, criticising Van der Bellen and Pope Francis, who had compared refugee camps to concentration camps.

Kneissl was nominated by FPÖ as a non-party member for the post of Foreign Minister of Austria in the government of Sebastian Kurz. Kneissl is the third woman to hold this function. Her nomination might also be linked to the reservations expressed by head of state Van der Bellen concerning other FPÖ-endorsed candidates for the post.
Kneissl was praised by FPÖ leader Heinz-Christian Strache as "a great personality, a female Kreisky perhaps in the future when it comes to mediation, acceptance and advertising for Austria abroad."

In addition to her native German, Kneissl works in Arabic, English, French, and Spanish. Furthermore, she has basic knowledge of Hebrew, Hungarian, and Italian.

In August 2018, she married entrepreneur Wolfgang Meilinger, 54, at a ceremony in the small town of Gamlitz, near the border with Slovenia. During the wedding, she danced with Vladimir Putin, who was in attandence, and subsequently performed a deep curtsey. Pictures of her submissive gesture, a European foreign minister bowing in front of Putin, were widely published in Russian and international media, and sparked major outrage and criticism due to her perceived naivety. In 2019, after a vote of no confidence ended the First Kurz government, she left political office.

In 2020, Kneissl started to contribute opinion articles to RT. She has been labeled as an advocate for the political agenda of the Kremlin. Shortly before the Russian invasion of Ukraine, she dismissed intelligence reports suggesting that invasion as Western "war hysteria", blown up by the media.

In March 2021, Kneissl, who had disclosed financial problems at the beginning of the COVID-19 pandemic, was reported to have been appointed by the Russian Government to the Board of Directors of the state gas company Rosneft. She also became a regular op-ed columnist at the Russian government outlet RT.

Kneissl resigned from the board of Rosneft in May 2022, after the Russian invasion of Ukraine. According to text messages she sent to a Washington Post reporter, she had emigrated from Austria because of "death threats."

On 5 September 2022, she appeared at Eastern Economic Forum in Vladivostok, Russia where she was interviewed by RIA and declared she immigrated to Lebanon.

Publications 
 Der Grenzbegriff der Konfliktparteien im Nahen Osten. Dissertation, Universität Wien, 1991.
 Hizbollah: Libanesische Widerstandsbewegung, islamische Terrorgruppe oder bloss eine politische Partei? Eine Untersuchung der schiitischen Massenbewegung Hizbollah im libanesischen und regionalen Kontext. Landesverteidigungsakademie, Wien 2002, .
 Der Energiepoker: Wie Erdöl und Erdgas die Weltwirtschaft beeinflussen. FinanzBuch, München 2006, ; 2., überarbeitete Auflage 2008, .
 Die Gewaltspirale: Warum Orient und Okzident nicht miteinander können. Ecowin, Salzburg 2007, .
 Testosteron Macht Politik. Braumüller, Wien 2012, .
 Die zersplitterte Welt: Was von der Globalisierung bleibt. Braumüller, Wien 2013, .
 Mein Naher Osten. Braumüller, Wien 2014, .
 Prinz Eugen: Vom Außenseiter zum Genie Europas. Belvedere, Wien 2014, .
 Wachablöse: Auf dem Weg in eine chinesische Weltordnung. Frank & Frei, 1 September 2017, 
 Diplomatie Macht Geschichte: Die Kunst des Dialogs in unsicheren Zeiten. Georg Olms Verlag, Hildesheim 2020, 
 Die Mobilitätswende: und ihre Brisanz für Gesellschaft und Weltwirtschaft. Braumüller Verlag, Wien 2020,

References

External links

 
 Personal website

1965 births
Living people
Foreign ministers of Austria
Austrian women diplomats
Arabists
University of Vienna alumni
Austrian expatriates in Jordan
Women government ministers of Austria
Female foreign ministers
21st-century Austrian women politicians
21st-century Austrian politicians
Fulbright alumni